Destination Rome (French : Tempo di Roma, Italian: Esame di guida) is a 1963 French-Italian comedy film directed by Denys de La Patellière and starring Charles Aznavour, Serena Vergano, Marisa Merlini and Arletty. It was one of a large number of co-productions made between the countries in the post-war era.

Cast
 Charles Aznavour as Marcello
 Serena Vergano as Geronima
 Marisa Merlini as Pia
 Arletty as La marquise
 Gregor von Rezzori as Sir Craven
 Alberto Lupo as 	Paolino
 Monique Bertho as La prostituée
 Marcella Valeri as Francesca
 Mario Carotenuto as Le cardinal
 Gianrico Tedeschi as a Crook
 Fanfulla as Torquato
 Burt Nelson	
 Jean-Michel Audin

References

Bibliography 
 Jean A. Gili & Aldo Tassone. Parigi-Roma: 50 anni di coproduzioni italo-francesi (1945-1995). Editrice Il castoro, 1995.

External links 
 

1963 films
French comedy films
Italian comedy films
1963 comedy films
1960s French-language films
Films directed by Denys de La Patellière
Films set in Rome
Pathé films
1960s French films
1960s Italian films